Monsignor Juan Subercaseaux Errázuriz (26 August 1896 – 9 August 1942) was a Chilean Roman Catholic archbishop. Juan Subercaseaux was of French and  Basque descent.

Biography 
Juan Subercaseaux was born in Santiago, the son of Ramón Subercaseaux Vicuña, a career diplomat, Ambassador of Chile to the Holy See for more than two decades and Amalia Errázuriz Urmeneta, writer, author of the book "Rome of the spirit". Young Juan was educated in the values of the faith, in a deeply Catholic family, had as spiritual director the famous Chilean priest, Miguel León Prado, who would become, years later, the first bishop of the Diocese of Linares. Juan went to the prestigious Jesuit school of "San Ignacio" in Santiago, and from there he went directly to the Santiago Seminar in order to continue his education. After his ordination he continued his studies of Philosophy and Theology in Rome, initially at the Pontificia Università Gregoriana and, subsequently, at the Pontificio Collegio Pio Latino Americano of Rome and at the "Accademia dei Nobili Ecclesiastici" (nowadays "Pontificia Accademia Ecclesiastica)", where he obtained the doctorate in Philosophy and Theology.

Ordained Priest of Santiago de Chile on 3 April 1920, he was consecrated Bishop of Linares on 28 April 1935 by the Apostolic Nuncio in Chile, Archbishop Ettore Felici. Appointed Archbishop of La Serena in 1940. He was awarded the Order of the Crown of Italy and died in a road accident near La Serena.

Ecclesiastical life

Additional information

See also 
Subercaseaux family

Sources 

Catholic Hierarchy
Buena Nueva, periodical of Linares Diocese (Chile).

1896 births
1942 deaths
J
Chilean people of Basque descent
Chilean people of French descent
20th-century Roman Catholic bishops in Chile
20th-century Roman Catholic archbishops in Chile
Road incident deaths in Chile
Subercaseaux family
Roman Catholic archbishops of La Serena
Roman Catholic bishops of Linares